Seal Song is a folk album by Ossian, released in 1981. The original LP release was on Iona Records (catalogue number IONA IR0002), with at least one re-release on CD.

The album was recorded at Castle Sound Studios, The Old School, Pencaitland, East Lothian, Scotland during 1981, produced by Ossian and engineered by Calum Malcolm.

Track listing 
This listing is taken from the original LP release. All titles are traditional arr. Ossian except where noted.

The Sound of Sleat (D. Mackinnon)/Aandowin' at the bow/The old reel (4:28)
To pad the road wi' me (2:38)
Coilsfield House (Nathaniel Gow) (4:04)
The hielandmen cam' doon the hill/The Thornton jig (3:33)
Aye waukin-o (4:20)
Corn rigs (Robert Burns) (3:20)
Lude's supper (Rory Dall) (2:47)
The road to Drumleman (Mitchell/Cuffe) (4:29)
A fisherman's song for attracting seals/Walking the floor (J. Chisholm) (5:27)
Mull of the mountains (4:38)

Personnel 
Billy Jackson - harp, uilleann pipes, whistle, vocals
George Jackson - cittern, guitar, flute, whistle
John Martin - fiddle, cello, whistle, vocals
Tony Cuffe - vocals, guitar, whistle, tiplé

References

1981 albums